Myra Hamilton Green (November 28, 1924 - March 26, 2002) was an American painter from the state of Mississippi. She specialized in portraits in acrylic paint.

Life
Green was born on November 28, 1924 in Fayetteville, Tennessee. She was trained at the Art Students' League in Woodstock, New York. Green attended Virginia Intermont College.

Green specialized in portraits, and she used acrylic paint. She was a member of the Mississippi Art Colony in the 1950s-1970s, and she taught workshops and lectures, including at Belhaven College and Millsaps College. With her daughter Lynn Green Root, who was also a painter, Green exhibited her paintings at the Municipal Art Gallery in Jackson, Mississippi in 1999. The exhibition was called Myra Green and Lynn Green Root: A Mother Daughter Exhibition.

Green died on March 26, 2002 in Jackson, Mississippi, and she was buried in Cedar Lawn Cemetery. Green's family requested memorial donations to the Mississippi Museum of Art.

Further reading

References

1924 births
2002 deaths
People from Fayetteville, Tennessee
Artists from Jackson, Mississippi
American portrait painters
American women painters
Painters from Mississippi
20th-century American painters
20th-century American women artists